Jens Fjellström (born 27 October 1966) is a former footballer and  football commentator. He is currently working as a scout for the Danish national football team.

Club career
Fjellström started his career at local Umeå club Gimonäs CK. After the bigger clubs noticed his skills he moved to Stockholm and Djurgårdens IF. He remained at Djurgården for five seasons before moving to Malmö FF. He enjoyed much success at the club and went on a loan to Dalian Wanda in China before playing a final season in Malmö. Fjellström decided to end his career after a knee injury had made him miss a season after which he thought that he couldn't perform at the same level as before his injury.

International career 
Fjellström won a total of three caps for the Sweden national team, He scored his first and only international goal in a friendly match against Norway on 22 August 1990, which was also his international debut.

After retiring
After retiring, Fjellström worked 15 years as a football expert on Swedish TV-channel TV4. He didn't extend his contract with the channel and instead on 26 July 2016, he was appointed as assistant manager of Malmö FF. He left the position on 21 January 2019.

In March 2019, he announced that he was going to work for the Danish national football team as a scout. His job was to go out and watch Denmark's opponents and then compile reports and give to manager Åge Hareide.

References

1966 births
Living people
Sportspeople from Umeå
Swedish footballers
Djurgårdens IF Fotboll players
Malmö FF players
Allsvenskan players
Superettan players
Dalian Shide F.C. players
Sweden international footballers
Swedish expatriate footballers
Expatriate footballers in China
Swedish expatriate sportspeople in China
Swedish association football commentators
Association football midfielders